Pescasseroli (Marsicano:) is a town and comune  in the province of L'Aquila, in Southern Abruzzo, central Italy.

A summer and winter resort, it is also the location of the Abruzzo National Park, nestled in the heart of the Monti Marsicani.

In 1866, the philosopher Benedetto Croce was born there.

History 

The domain of the Borrello Family in the 11th century, Pescasseroli passed as a 'sub-fief' of the Di Sangro family. After the fall of the Swabians, it came under the Aquinas family. In 1349, when Adenolfo II Aquinas died under the ruins of the castle of Alvito, it passed to a branch of the Counts of Loreto. In 1461, the barony of Pescasseroli was inherited by Antonella d'Aquino, Marquise of Pescara. At the end of the sixteenth century, the estate was sold to Giovan Giacomo di Sangro, who died in 1607. Put up for auction, it is recorded as having a succession of different owners until 1705, when for the price of 15,770 ducats, it was acquired by the Massa family of Sorrento. They were the last barons of Pescasseroli before the advent of the new nineteenth-century bourgeoisie, in this case exemplified by the Sipari family.

The Pescasseroli-Candela  sheep route or "tratturo" started in imperial times as a military route used by the Roman legions. In the Middle Ages it became a route for sheep grazing migration from the higher and colder mountains of Abruzzo to the lower pastures of Puglia. With a distance of  it is the third longest "tratturo" in southern Italy.

Main sights
Abbey of Sts. Peter and Paul, founded around 1100. It houses a wooden statue of Madonna with Child from the 13th century.

Tourism 
Tourism is today's economic resource. Pescasseroli  is considered the most important center of the Abruzzo National Park. At the center of the most interesting natural itineraries,  the town offers a range of services and facilities that meet  the demands of tourists and vacationers all year round in the protected area: a visitor center of the park, nature museum, wildlife area, botanical garden, the ski slopes of the mountain of Vitelle, equipped with parking. Foremost is protected wild life and untouched nature that offers an important variety of flora and fauna along with all the related services and hospitality. All this, along with its hospitable inhabitants, makes Pescasseroli a favorite destination for summer holidays and for winter sports.

Twin towns – sister cities

Pescasseroli is twinned with:
Foggia, Italy
Candela, Italy
Castellane, France
Buffalo, New York, United States

See also
 Abruzzo National Park
 24 Hours in Pescasseroli – Capital of Italy’s First & Oldest National Park

References

 Microsoft Corp. Encarta Encyclopedia. Italian edition (2002).

Cities and towns in Abruzzo
Marsica